John ("Jake") Richard Easonsmith  (12 April 1909 – 16 November 1943) was a British Army soldier during World War II. He was killed in action on the Dodecanese island of Leros whilst commanding the Long Range Desert Group in 1943. W. B. Kennedy-Shaw described him as: "Brave, wise, with an uprightness that shamed lesser men, he was, I think, the finest man we ever had in the L.R.D.G."

Early life
John Richard Easonsmith was born in Bristol, England, on 12 April 1909, the son of George Easonsmith, a printer, and Daisy Easonsmith. He received his education at Mill Hill School in London, and Clifton College, Bristol. After leaving school he joined W.D. and H.O. Wills a British a tobacco importer and cigarette manufacturer in Bristol. Afterwards he entered the wine trade as a salesman with the Emu Australian Wine Company Limited. Recreationally he was a member and played for the Clifton Rugby Football Club. He married Honor Gertrude Marsh and together they had a daughter.

Military career
On the outbreak of the World War II in September 1939 Easonsmith joined the 4th Battalion Gloucestershire Regiment, a Territorial Army unit, that subsequently was converted to the 66th Search Light Regiment Royal Artillery. By August 1940 he had been promoted to the rank of sergeant and recommended for a commission, at the same time transferring to the Royal Tank Regiment. Having completed his officer training he received a commission as a subaltern in July 1940, and was posted to Egypt to take part in the British Empire's North Africa Campaign in December 1940. In March 1941 he applied for a transfer into the behind-enemy-lines reconnaissance unit the Long Range Desert Group.

In August he was promoted to the rank of captain. He took part in the L.R.D.G.'s New Zealander 'R1' Patrol's mission to pick up a detachment of the Special Air Service Regiment after that regiment's failed "Operation Squatter" raid against Axis desert airfields in November 1941. In December 1941 he was awarded the Military Cross for gallantry in action. Easonsmith led the Barce Raid. He was promoted to the rank of Major in October 1942, and in November 1942 was awarded the Distinguished Service Order. In October 1943 he was promoted to lieutenant colonel, and was appointed as the Commanding Officer of the Long Range Desert Group, as the unit left the North Africa theatre, and embarked upon the Dodecanese Campaign, landing on the island of Leros.

Death
Easonsmith was killed in action at the age of 34 on 15 November 1943 during the Battle of Leros, when he was shot by a German sniper whilst carrying out a lone reconnaissance of a village. His body was buried in Leros War Cemetery, the gravestone bearing the inscription dedication drawn from Rupert Brooke's poem "The Soldier": "Some corner of a foreign field that is for ever England".

Notes

References
Molinari, Andrea, Desert Raiders: Axis and Allied Special Forces 1940–43 (Botley, UK: Osprey Publishing, 2007) 
Lloyd Owen, David, Providence Their Guide: The Long Range Desert Group 1940–45 (London: George G. Harrap & Co. Ltd, 1980) 
Kennedy Shaw, W. B., Long Range Desert Group (London: Greenhill Books, 1989) 

People educated at Clifton College
People educated at Mill Hill School
1909 births
1943 deaths
British Army personnel killed in World War II
Companions of the Distinguished Service Order
Military personnel from Bristol
Recipients of the Military Cross
Royal Tank Regiment officers
Royal Artillery soldiers
Long Range Desert Group personnel